Grace Lee Whitney (born Mary Ann Chase; April 1, 1930 – May 1, 2015) was an American actress and singer. She played Janice Rand on the original Star Trek television series and subsequent Star Trek films.

Early life
Whitney was born on April 1, 1930 in Ann Arbor, Michigan and was adopted by the Whitney family, who changed her name to Grace Elaine. She started her entertainment career as a "girl singer" on Detroit's WJR radio at age 14. After she left home, she began to call herself Lee Whitney, eventually becoming known as Grace Lee Whitney. In her late teens, she moved to Chicago, where she opened in nightclubs for Billie Holiday and Buddy Rich, and toured with the Spike Jones and Fred Waring bands.

Early roles
Whitney debuted on Broadway in Top Banana, with Phil Silvers and Kaye Ballard, playing Miss Holland. Following the successful run of the show, she joined the cast in Hollywood, where she recreated the role in the 1954 movie of the same name. While in Los Angeles, Whitney auditioned for and was cast in the starring role of Lucy Brown in the national tour of The Threepenny Opera, taking over the role from Bea Arthur, who had played the part in New York off-Broadway.

Whitney made more than 100 television appearances following her television dramatic debut in Cowboy G-Men in 1953. She appeared on episodes of The Real McCoys, Wagon Train, The Islanders, Hennesey, The Roaring 20s, Gunsmoke, Bat Masterson, The Rifleman, 77 Sunset Strip, Mike Hammer, Batman, The Untouchables, and Hawaiian Eye.

During the 1950s and early 1960s, Whitney was a frequent semiregular on over 80 live television shows, including You Bet Your Life hosted by Groucho Marx in 1953, The Red Skelton Show, The Jimmy Durante Show, and The Ernie Kovacs Show, largely appearing in gag sketches. From 1957 to 1958, she appeared as a "Vanna-type adornment" on the popular daytime show Queen for a Day.

Her other appearances included an episode of The Outer Limits, "Controlled Experiment", co-starring Barry Morse and Carroll O'Connor, Mannix, Death Valley Days, The Big Valley, and The Virginian. In 1962, she appeared in the episode of The Rifleman entitled "The Tin Horn". In 1964, she played a character Babs Livingston on Bewitched in the episode "It Shouldn't Happen to a Dog".

Whitney was cast as a member of the all-female band in Billy Wilder's comedy Some Like It Hot (1959). She shared several scenes with Jack Lemmon, Tony Curtis, and Marilyn Monroe, including the "upper berth" sequence. She had uncredited roles in House of Wax (1953), Top Banana (1954), The Naked and the Dead (1958), and Pocketful of Miracles (1961). Whitney was credited as Tracey Phillips in the drama A Public Affair (1962), and as Texas Rose in the Western The Man from Galveston (1963). Billy Wilder then gave her the featured role of Kiki the Cossack in Irma la Douce (1963).

Star Trek

The original series
Star Trek creator Gene Roddenberry cast Whitney in the role of Yeoman Janice Rand, the personal assistant to Captain James T. Kirk, in 1966. Whitney appeared in eight of the first 15 episodes, after which she was released from contract. She said that, while still under contract, she was sexually assaulted by an executive associated with the series. Later, in a public interview, she stated that Leonard Nimoy had been her main source of support during that time. She went into more details about the assault in her book The Longest Trek, but refused to name the executive, saying in the book, "This is my story, not his."

Return to Star Trek franchise

Whitney returned to the Star Trek franchise in the 1970s after DeForest Kelley saw Whitney in the unemployment line and told her that fans had been asking for her at fan conventions.

Whitney reprised her role as Janice Rand, who had received a promotion to chief petty officer in Star Trek: The Motion Picture (1979). She also appeared in Star Trek III: The Search for Spock (1984), Star Trek IV: The Voyage Home (1986), and Star Trek VI: The Undiscovered Country (1991), with another promotion, as Lieutenant Commander Janice Rand.

Five years later, to celebrate the 30th anniversary of the franchise, she returned in the 1996 Star Trek: Voyager episode "Flashback", along with George Takei.

As well as these canonical appearances, Whitney reprised her role in two fan-created Star Trek productions: "Star Trek: New Voyages" and "Star Trek: Of Gods and Men". "New Voyages" premiered on August 24, 2007, while "Of Gods and Men" made its debut in late 2007. The fifth episode of Star Trek Continues, "Divided We Stand" (released September 26, 2015), was dedicated to her "lovely and endearing spirit".

Later TV roles
Her roles in the 1970s included The Bold Ones, Cannon, and Hart to Hart. In 1983, she had a small part in the television film The Kid with the 200 I.Q., with Gary Coleman. In 1998, she appeared in an episode of Diagnosis: Murder, which reunited her with her Star Trek colleagues George Takei, Walter Koenig, and Majel Barrett.

Music

In the 1960s and 1970s, she sang with a number of orchestras and bands, including the Keith Williams Orchestra. Later, she concentrated on jazz/pop vocalizing while fronting for the band Star. In the 1970s, with her second husband, Jack Dale, she wrote a number of Star Trek-related songs. A 45-rpm record was released in 1976 with the songs "Disco Trekkin’" (A side) and "Star Child" (B side). She recorded such tunes as "Charlie X", "Miri", "Enemy Within", and "USS Enterprise". Many of these songs were released in the 1990s on cassette tape: Light at the End of the Tunnel in 1996 and Yeoman Rand Sings! in 1999.

Autobiography
Whitney's autobiography, The Longest Trek: My Tour of the Galaxy, was released in 1998. Along with her hiring and firing from Star Trek, the book recounts her work as the first Chicken of the Sea mermaid and her struggles with and eventual recovery from alcohol and substance abuse.

Personal life and death
Whitney had two sons, Scott and Jonathan Dweck. She moved to Coarsegold, California in 1993 to be close to Jonathan, and she "continued her fellowship work in Fresno and Madera counties." Jonathan Dweck said his mother wanted to be known more as a survivor of addiction than as a Star Trek cast member.

Whitney frequently attended Star Trek and science-fiction fan conventions from the 1980s. 

Her last film appearance (and as a Star Trek character) was in the fan fiction film Of Gods and Men in 2007. Her final screen appearance was in the William Shatner documentary The Captains in 2011.

Whitney died of natural causes at her home in Coarsegold on May 1, 2015 at age 85.

Filmography

References

External links

 
 

1930 births
2015 deaths
20th-century American actresses
20th-century American women writers
Actors from Ann Arbor, Michigan
Actresses from Michigan
American adoptees
American film actresses
20th-century American memoirists
American musical theatre actresses
American television actresses
People from Coarsegold, California
20th-century American singers
20th-century American women singers
American women memoirists
21st-century American women